Rugbyclub Waereghem is a Belgian rugby club in Waregem.

History
The club was founded in 2009.

Belgian rugby union clubs
Rugby clubs established in 2009
Waregem